The following polls make up the 2008 NCAA Division I baseball rankings.  USA Today and ESPN began publishing the Coaches' Poll of 31 active coaches ranking the top 25 teams in the nation in 1992.  Each coach is a member of the American Baseball Coaches Association.  Baseball America began publishing its poll of the top 20 teams in college baseball in 1981.  Beginning with the 1985 season, it expanded to the top 25.  Collegiate Baseball Newspaper published its first human poll of the top 20 teams in college baseball in 1957, and expanded to rank the top 30 teams in 1961.

Legend

USA Today/ESPN Coaches' Poll

Baseball America

Collegiate Baseball

The preseason poll ranked the top 40 teams.  Remaining teams not listed above were: 31.  32. Louisiana–Lafayette 33.  34.  35.  36.  37.  38. Nebraska 39.  40.

NCBWA

The Preseason poll ranked the top 35 teams.  Teams not listed above were: 31.  32.  33.  34. LSU 35.

References

 
College baseball rankings in the United States